Yoshihiro Kamegai (亀海喜寛 Kamegai Yoshihiro, born November 12, 1982) is a Japanese former professional boxer who competed from 2005 to 2018. affiliated with the Teiken Boxing Gym and Golden Boy Promotions. He secured the Japanese super lightweight title in 2010 as the 33rd champion and defended it once before vacating it. He made his U.S. boxing debut in 2011, securing a victory over Hector Munoz at the MGM Grand. He became the 38th OPBF welterweight champion, securing the title in 2013 before vacating it after one defense. He fought Miguel Cotto for the vacant WBO light middleweight world title.

Professional career

Kamegai vs. Pérez
Kamegai fought Johan Pérez for the WBA International welterweight title, and was dealt his first professional defeat via unanimous decision. The close range brawling style of Kamegai just wasn't in tune to fight against the moving style of Perez.

OPBF Welterweight Title 
Kamegai fought Tim Hunt for the vacant OPBF Welterweight Title, securing the title via technical knockout in the fifth round. He later defended the title against Jung Hoon Yang Kamegai later vacated the title as his focused shifted towards the United States.

Kamegai vs. Guerrero
Kamegai fought Robert Guerrero on June 21, 2014. The fight was a brutal back and forth slug-fest with Guererro hardly able open his left eye toward the end of the fight. Nevertheless, Guerrero scored a unanimous 12-round decision over Kamegai with official scores of 116-112, 117-111, and 117-111, giving him his second loss.

Kamegai vs. Gomez
Kamegai fought Alfonso Gómez in 2015. They fought head to head for the match with Gomez ahead on points, making an effective usage of his jab versus a determined Kamegai who kept absorbing punches and going forward, seeking Gomez' liver. An accidental headbutt mid-fight cost Gomez a point deduction. However, despite Kamegai's persistent pressure, Gomez was able to work around the ring more successfully, resulting in Kamegai losing by unanimous decision.

Kamegai vs. Soto Karass I
Kamegai fought Jesus Soto Karass for the first time on April 15, 2016. They fought toe to toe in a close range war exchanging punches non-stop, with neither fighter backing off for the entirety of the match. Though Soto Karass was throwing a more sheer number of punches, Kamegai's were landing more precisely, making the punches between the two virtually even, with little distinguishment of power of their blows. The fight eventually ended in a draw by a split decision from the judges.

Kamegai vs. Soto Karass II
A rematch between Kamegai and Soto Karass was held shortly after the first, on September 10, 2016. In this match Kamegai was able to damage Soto Karass early with a left body blow from the side. The rest of the fight played out similarly to the first, with each fighter duking it out in a full-fledged brawl. Kamegai's punches began to outland Soto Karass and started to gain leverage in the fight, pushing Soto Karass back. Kamegai landed flush shots for the remainder of the match until Soto Karass retired in the corner, which was labeled as a TKO.

Kamegai vs. Cotto
On May 24, it was announced a deal was made for a fight between Cotto and Kamegai to take place on August 26, 2017 at the StubHub Center in Carson, California live on HBO.

Professional boxing record

References

External links
 

1982 births
Living people
Japanese male boxers
Sportspeople from Sapporo
Light-welterweight boxers
Welterweight boxers
Light-middleweight boxers
Middleweight boxers